Scotura fusciceps is a moth of the family Notodontidae. It is found in Brazil, French Guiana and Guyana.

References

Moths described in 1909
Notodontidae of South America